Marco D'Altrui (born 25 April 1964 in Naples) is an Italian water polo player. He competed at the 1984, 1988, and 1992 Summer Olympics. His father Giuseppe was a member of the Italian water polo team which won the gold medal in 1960.

See also
 Italy men's Olympic water polo team records and statistics
 List of Olympic champions in men's water polo
 List of Olympic medalists in water polo (men)
 List of world champions in men's water polo
 List of World Aquatics Championships medalists in water polo
 List of members of the International Swimming Hall of Fame

References

External links
 

1964 births
Living people
Sportspeople from Naples
Italian male water polo players
Olympic water polo players of Italy
Water polo players at the 1984 Summer Olympics
Water polo players at the 1988 Summer Olympics
Water polo players at the 1992 Summer Olympics
Olympic gold medalists for Italy
Olympic medalists in water polo
Medalists at the 1992 Summer Olympics